The 2018 WNBA season was the 11th season for the Atlanta Dream of the Women's National Basketball Association. The team began its season on May 20, 2018 against the Dallas Wings.

The Dream started the season slowly, going 2–2 in May with both losses coming to Dallas.  The team continued to not be able to build momentum in June, posting a 5–6 record.  The team started well in the month, going on a three game win streak, but couldn't continue that run, winning just 2 of the final 7 games in the month.  However, the Dream found another gear in July.  The Dream went on an 8 game winning streak and head coach Nicki Collen was awarded the Coach of the Month.  The team finished the month 9–2 and in prime playoff position.  The team continued its run in August, going 6–1 with their only loss on the road against Phoenix.  Collen was again voted coach of the month.  However, on August 9th, the team lost their star Angel McCoughtry for the season with torn ligaments in her left knee.  The team finished a franchise–best 23–11 which entered them into the 2018 WNBA Playoffs as the second seed.

As the second seed, Atlanta earned a double bye into the semifinal round.  There, Atlanta faced off against the Washington Mystics.  The Mystics were the third seed, finishing one game behind Atlanta in the regular season.  The series was a close one, with the Mystics star Elena Delle Donne getting injured in game 3.  However, the Dream were not able to capitalize and eventually lost the series 2 games to 3.

Transactions

WNBA Draft

Trades and Roster Changes

Roster
{| class="toccolours" style="font-size: 95%; width: 100%;"
|-
! colspan="2" style="background:#6495ED;color:white;"|2018 Atlanta Dream Roster
|- style="text-align:center; background-color:#FF0000; color:#FFFFFF;"
! Players !! Coaches
|-
| valign="top" |
{| class="sortable" style="background:transparent; margin:0px; width:100%;"
! Pos. !! # !! Nat. !! Name !! Ht. !! Wt. !! From
|-

Depth

Schedule

Preseason

|- style="background:#bbffbb;"
| 1
| May 6
| @ Chicago
| W 78–61
| Hayes (16)
| Williams (7)
| Montgomery (7)
| Wintrust Arena
| 1–0
|- bgcolor="ffcccc"
| 2
| May 11
| vs. Connecticut
| L 58–74
| Clarendon (13)
| Williams (6)
| Montgomery (3)
| Webster Bank Arena1,610
| 1–1

Regular season

|- bgcolor="ffcccc"
| 1
| May 20
| @ Dallas
| L 78–101
| 3 Tied (14)
| Sykes (7)
| Hayes (6)
| College Park Center5,907
| 0–1
|- style="background:#bbffbb;"
| 2
| May 23
| @ Chicago
| W 81–63
| Hayes (22)
| Breland (10)
| Williams (6)
| Wintrust Arena6,147
| 1–1
|- bgcolor="ffcccc"
| 3
| May 26
| Dallas
| L 80–87
| McCoughtry (19)
| Breland (10)
| Hayes (4)
| McCamish Pavilion4,749
| 1–2
|- style="background:#bbffbb;"
| 4
| May 29
| Minnesota
| W 76–74
| Hayes (20)
| Tied (7)
| Tied (5)
| McCamish Pavilion3,785
| 2–2
|-

|- bgcolor="ffcccc"
| 5
| June 3
| Phoenix
| L 71–78
| McCoughtry (21)
| Tied (10)
| Clarendon (3)
| McCamish Pavilion3,795
| 2–3
|- style="background:#bbffbb;"
| 6
| June 5
| Connecticut
| W 82–77
| Hayes (22)
| Breland (9)
| Tied (4)
| McCamish Pavilion2,830
| 3–3
|- style="background:#bbffbb;"
| 7
| June 8
| @ Las Vegas
| W 87–83
| Hayes (24)
| Tied (9)
| McCoughtry (6)
| Mandalay Bay Events Center5,913
| 4–3
|- style="background:#bbffbb;"
| 8
| June 10
| @ Seattle
| W 67–64
| Hayes (23)
| Breland (14)
| 4 Tied (2)
| KeyArena6,345
| 5–3
|- bgcolor="ffcccc"
| 9
| June 12
| @ Los Angeles
| L 64–72
| Hayes (16)
| Breland (6)
| Hayes (3)
| Staples Center9,215
| 5–4
|- style="background:#bbffbb;"
| 10
| June 14
| Indiana
| W 72–67
| Hayes (23)
| Breland (13)
| McCoughtry (4)
| McCamish Pavilion6,561
| 6–4
|- bgcolor="ffcccc"
| 11
| June 16
| @ Indiana
| L 64–96
| McCoughtry (19)
| McCoughtry (8)
| Clarendon (4)
| Bankers Life Fieldhouse6,234
| 6–5
|- bgcolor="ffcccc"
| 12
| June 19
| @ New York
| L 72–79
| McCoughtry (39)
| McCoughtry (14)
| McCoughtry (4)
| Westchester County Center1,627
| 6–6
|- style="background:#bbffbb;"
| 13
| June 22
| Connecticut
| W 75–70
| McCoughtry (25)
| Williams (10)
| Sykes (4)
| McCamish Pavilion4,047
| 7–6
|- bgcolor="ffcccc"
| 14
| June 27
| @ Chicago
| L 80–93
| Montgomery (19)
| Breland (7)
| Montgomery (5)
| Wintrust Arena8,521
| 7–7
|- bgcolor="ffcccc"
| 15
| June 29
| @ Minnesota
| L 74–85
| McGee-Stafford (15)
| Breland (10)
| Montgomery (6)
| Target Center9,209
| 7–8
|-

|- style="background:#bbffbb;"
| 16
| July 1
| @ Indiana
| W 87–83
| Sykes (20)
| Tied (6)
| Sykes (7)
| Bankers Life Fieldhouse5,277
| 8–8
|- bgcolor="ffcccc"
| 17
| July 6
| Seattle
| L 86–95
| McCoughtry (26)
| Sykes (6)
| Dantas (5)
| McCamish Pavilion3,935
| 8–9
|- style="background:#bbffbb;"
| 18
| July 8
| Phoenix
| W 76–70
| Hayes (18)
| Breland (12)
| McCoughtry (4)
| McCamish Pavilion3,952
| 9–9
|- style="background:#bbffbb;"
| 19
| July 11
| @ Washington
| W 106–89
| McCoughtry (26)
| Breland (10)
| Breland (7)
| Capital One Arena11,354
| 10–9
|- style="background:#bbffbb;"
| 20
| July 13
| Indiana
| W 98–74
| Hayes (16)
| Breland (8)
| McCoughtry (7)
| McCamish Pavilion3,807
| 11–9
|- style="background:#bbffbb;"
| 21
| July 15
| Washington
| W 80–77
| Sykes (17)
| Breland (10)
| Bentley (4)
| McCamish Pavilion3,880
| 12–9
|- style="background:#bbffbb;"
| 22
| July 17
| @ Connecticut
| W 86–83
| McCoughtry (24)
| Breland (11)
| Tied (4)
| Mohegan Sun Arena5,555
| 13–9
|- style="background:#bbffbb;"
| 23
| July 19
| New York
| W 82–68
| Montgomery (24)
| Tied (12)
| McCoughtry (6)
| McCamish Pavilion3,074
| 14–9
|- style="background:#bbffbb;"
| 24
| July 22
| Seattle
| W 87–74
| Williams (17)
| Tied (8)
| Hayes (5)
| McCamish Pavilion4,916
| 15–9
|- style="background:#bbffbb;"
| 25
| July 24
| @ Los Angeles
| W 81–87
| McCoughtry (19)
| McCoughtry (7)
| Montgomery (6)
| Staples Center9,324
| 16–9
|- bgcolor="ffcccc"
| 26
| July 31
| Washington
| L 71–86
| Hayes (18)
| Williams (9)
| Sykes (5)
| McCamish Pavilion3,648
| 16–10
|-

|- style="background:#bbffbb;"
| 27
| August 3
| Chicago
| W 89–74
| McCoughtry (21)
| Breland (9)
| Bentley (7)
| McCamish Pavilion5,120
| 17–10
|- style="background:#bbffbb;"
| 28
| August 5
| @ Minnesota
| W 86–66
| Hayes (28)
| Tied (8)
| Sykes (6)
| Target Center9,333
| 18–10
|- style="background:#bbffbb;"
| 29
| August 7
| Las Vegas
| W 109–100
| Tied (22)
| Breland (11)
| Bentley (8)
| McCamish Pavilion4,033
| 19–10
|- style="background:#bbffbb;"
| 30
| August 9
| Los Angeles
| W 79–73
| Breland (19)
| Breland (9)
| Bentley (8)
| McCamish Pavilion4,235
| 20–10
|- style="background:#bbffbb;"
| 31
| August 11
| Dallas
| W 92–82
| Montgomery (24)
| Williams (9)
| 3 Tied (5)
| McCamish Pavilion4,937
| 21–10
|- style="background:#bbffbb;"
| 32
| August 12
| @ New York
| W 86–77
| Montgomery (30)
| Tied (7)
| Sykes (4)
| Westchester County Center2,362
| 22–10
|- bgcolor="ffcccc"
| 33
| August 17
| @ Phoenix
| L 95–104
| Bentley (24)
| Williams (8)
| Bentley (6)
| Talking Stick Resort Arena11,177
| 22–11
|- style="background:#bbffbb;"
| 34
| August 19
| @ Las Vegas
| W 93–78
| Williams (20)
| Williams (7)
| Montgomery (9)
| Mandalay Bay Events Center5,737
| 23–11

Playoffs

|- bgcolor="ffcccc"
| 1
| August 26
| Washington
| L 84–87
| Bentley (19)
| Williams (14)
| 5 Tied (2)
| McCamish Pavilion5,086
| 0–1
|- style="background:#bbffbb;"
| 2
| August 28
| Washington
| W 78–75
| Bentley (22)
| Breland (14)
| Hayes (6)
| McCamish Pavilion3,813
| 1–1
|- style="background:#bbffbb;"
| 3
| August 31
| Washington
| W 81–76
| Hayes (23)
| Breland (11)
| Montgomery (3)
| Charles Smith Center3,867
| 2–1
|- bgcolor="ffcccc"
| 4
| September 2
| Washington
| 76–97
| Tied (12)
| Breland (8)
| Montgomery (10)
| Charles Smith Center3,722
| 2–2
|- bgcolor="ffcccc"
| 5
| September 4
| Washington
| 81–86
| Bentley (16)
| Breland (12)
| Hayes (4)
| McCamish Pavilion4,435
| 2–3

Standings

Playoffs

Statistics

Regular Season

Playoffs

Awards and Honors

References

External links
THE OFFICIAL SITE OF THE ATLANTA DREAM

Atlanta Dream seasons
Atlanta
Atlanta Dream